Währinger Straße-Volksoper  is a station on  of the Vienna U-Bahn. It is located in the Alsergrund District. It opened in 1989.

References

External links 
 

Buildings and structures in Alsergrund
Railway stations opened in 1989
1989 establishments in Austria
Vienna U-Bahn stations
Railway stations in Austria opened in the 20th century